Mykhailo or Mykhaylois a Ukrainian given name, equivalent to English Michael. Notable people with the name include:

Mykhaylo Berkos (1861–1919), Russian and Ukraine artist of Greek origin
Mykhailo Bolotskykh (born 1960), Ukrainian statesman and military serviceman, Colonel General (Civil Defense Service)
Mykhailo Brodskyy (born 1959), Ukrainian politician, leader of the Party of Free Democrats and businessman
Mykhaylo Chemberzhi, Ukrainian composer, teacher, scientist and statesman
Mykhaylo Chornyi (born 1933), Ukrainian Realist, Neo-Primitivist painter and graphic artist
Mykhaylo Denysov (born 1985), Ukrainian football player
Mykhailo Drahomanov (1841–1895), Ukrainian political theorist, economist, historian, philosopher, ethnographer and public figure in Kyiv
Mykhailo Dunets (born 1950), coach of Soviet Union and Ukraine
Mykhaylo Dyachuk-Stavytskyi (born 1989), professional Ukrainian football midfielder
Mykhaylo Fomenko (born 1948), current head coach of Ukraine's national football team, former Ukrainian footballer
Mykhaylo Forkash (1948–2011), Ukrainian and Soviet football player
Mykhailo Havryliuk (born 1979), Ukrainian public figure
Mykhailo Horyn (1930–2013), Ukrainian human rights activist and dissident
Mykhailo Hrushevsky (1866–1934), Ukrainian academician, politician, historian, and statesman, important figure of the Ukrainian national revival
Mykhaylo Ishchenko (born 1950), retired Soviet handball goalkeeper who competed in the 1972, 1976 and 1980 Summer Olympics
Michael Karkoc (1919–2019), military officer who served in the Ukrainian Self Defense Legion (USDL) and later in the Waffen-SS during World War II
Mykhaylo Khmelko (1919–1996), Ukrainian painter, People's Artist of the Ukrainian SSR, and double Stalin prize winner
Mykhaylo Koman (1928–2015), Soviet and Ukrainian footballer and coach of Lemko-Ruthenian origin
Mykhaylo Kononenko (born 1987), Ukrainian professional road cyclist who rides for the Kolss BDC Team
Mykhaylo Kopolovets (born 1984), professional Ukrainian football midfielder
Mykhailo Kotsopiy (born 1995), participated (2022) in the liberation of Kharkiv region from Russian troops
Mykhailo Kotsiubynsky (1864–1913),  Ukrainian impressionist and modernist author
Mykhailo Koval, Colonel General of Ukraine who until 2014 worked in the State Border Guard Service of Ukraine
Mykhaylo Kozak (born 1991), professional Ukrainian football striker, last played for FC Vorskla Poltava in the Ukrainian Premier League
Mykhailo Levytsky (1774–1858), Metropolitan Archbishop of the Ukrainian Greek Catholic Church from 1816 until his death
Mykhaylo Luchnik, Ukrainian sprint canoeist who competed in the late 1990s and early 2000s
Mykhailo Maksymovych (1804–1873), Ukrainian and Russian professor of botany, historian and writer of a Ukrainian Cossack background
Mykhaylo Mykhalyna (1924–1998), Czech, Hungarian, Ukrainian and Soviet professional football player, Soviet-Ukrainian football manager and coach
Mykhaylo Mykhaylov (born 1959), Ukrainian professional football coach and a former player
Mykhaylo Okhendovsky (born 1973) Ukrainian lawyer and Chairman of the Central Election Commission of Ukraine
Mykhaylo Olefirenko (born 1960), retired Ukrainian professional football coach and a former player
Mykhaylo Osadchy (1936–1994), Ukrainian journalist, poet, writer, and dissident
Mykhaylo Plokhotnyuk (born 1999), Ukrainian football player
Mykhaylo Pysko (born 1993), Ukrainian football defender
Mikhail Radionov (born 1984), retired track cyclist from Ukraine
Mykhaylo Renzhyn (born 1978), Israeli Alpine skier
Michael Rohoza (died 1599), the Ruthenian Metropolitan of Kiev, Galicia and All-Rus' from 1588 to his death
Mykhaylo Ryashko (born 1996), Ukrainian football midfielder
Mikhail Savchenko (born 1980), former Russian and Ukrainian football player
Mykhaylo Semenko, Ukrainian poet, the prominent representative of the Ukrainian futuristic poetry of 1920s
Mykhaylo Serhiychuk (born 1991), professional Ukrainian football striker
Michał Śliwiński (born 1970), Soviet/Ukrainian/Polish sprint canoeist, who has won six world championship titles
Mykhaylo Sokolovsky (born 1951), Ukrainian professional football coach and a former player
Mykhaylo Starostyak (born 1973), former Ukrainian football player
Mykhailo Starytsky (1840–1904), Ukrainian writer, poet, and playwright
Mykhailo Stelmakh (born 1966), Ukrainian football manager and former player
Mykhaylo Svystovych (born 1968), Ukrainian social activist, member of "Vidsich" civil movement, editor of "Maidan" magazine and economist
Mihail Tcaciuk (born 1971), former Moldovan and Ukrainian football player
Mikhail Tovarovsky (1903–1969), Soviet footballer, coach, and sport administrator from Ukraine
Mikhail Turovsky (born 1933), American artist-painter, and writer-aphorist, resident in New York since 1979
Mykhailo Verbytsky (1815–1870), Ukrainian Greek Catholic priest and composer
Mykhaylo Yakubovych (born 1986), Ukrainian Arabist, translator and scholar of Islamic Studies
Mykhaylo Zagirnyak, Ukrainian scientist (electromechanics), Rector of Kremenchuk Mykhailo Ostrohradskyi National University

See also
 Mykhaylenko
,  
, 

Ukrainian masculine given names